The moka pot is a stove-top or electric coffee maker that brews coffee by passing boiling water pressurized by steam through ground coffee. Named after the Yemeni city of Mocha, it was invented by Italian engineer Alfonso Bialetti in 1933 and quickly became one of the staples of Italian culture. Bialetti Industries continues to produce the same model under the trade name "Moka Express".

Spreading from Italy, the moka pot is today most commonly used in Europe and in Latin America. It has become an iconic design, displayed in modern industrial art and design museums including the Wolfsonian-FIU, the Cooper–Hewitt, National Design Museum, the Design Museum, the London Science Museum, The Smithsonian and the Museum of Modern Art. 
Moka pots come in different sizes, making from one to eighteen  servings. The original design and many current models are made from aluminium with Bakelite handles.

After the Second World War, the Italian moka pot spread all over the south of Europe and became the standard way of domestically making coffee. Its popularity led to non-Italian south European manufacturers making copies or new designs inspired by the original Italian design.

In Australia, the moka pot was traditionally used by Italian migrants who arrived mostly after the Second World War. By 2000 the moka had become popular in the homes of many Australians. Today it is quite popular at breakfast time; often Australians will add the brew to a mug and top up with either water off the boil or warmed milk.

Moka pots are typically made of aluminium, though they are sometimes made out of stainless steel or other alloys. Some designs feature an upper half made of heat-resistant glass.

Brewing coffee with a moka pot

Moka pots are used over a flame or electric range. Stainless steel, but not aluminium moka pots can be used with induction cooking.

Though everyday usage of these pots does not require much in the way of theoretical understanding, a number of physics papers have been written between 2001 and 2009 providing models for the process, utilizing the ideal gas law and Darcy's law to provide insights into how the pot works, dispelling the popular myth that a Moka pot needs to boil water to brew (the water's vapor pressure combined with the expanding gas is sufficient), and offering insights into the dynamics of extraction.

The boiler (marked A in the diagram) is filled with water almost up to the safety release valve (some models have an etched water level sign) and the funnel-shaped metal filter (B) is inserted. Italians generally do not preheat the water used, though established baristas such as James Hoffmann and Tristan Stephenson recommend using preheated water in the base. Simulations run by physicist Warren King also indicate that using cold water results in the coffee extracting at too low a temperature, but that boiling water may result in the temperature being too high. King recommends a 70°C preheat for optimal results. Finely ground coffee is added to the filter as shown below. How tightly the coffee is packed impacts how quickly the coffee extracts.  The pot is placed on a suitable heat source, so that the water is heated.

A gasket ensures a tightly closed unit and allows for pressure to safely build up in the lower section, where a safety valve provides a necessary release in case this pressure should get too high.

The heating of the boiler, A, leads to a gradual increase of the pressure due to both the expansion of the enclosed air and the raised vapor pressure of the increasingly heated water.  When pressure becomes high enough to force the water up the funnel through the coffee grinds, coffee will begin to pour into the upper chamber (C). Boiling the water is not necessaryor even desirableto produce sufficient pressure to brew and extraction temperature is in general not greater than that of other brewing methods.

When the lower chamber is almost empty, bubbles of steam mix with the upstreaming water, producing a characteristic gurgling noise. Navarini et al. call this the "strombolian" phase of brewing, which allows a mixture of highly heated steam and water to pass through the coffee, which leads to rapid overextraction and undesirable results; therefore, brewing should be stopped by removing the pot from the stove as soon as this stage is reached.

Counterintuitively, adding more water to the lower chamber will not allow more coffee to be extracted at the same temperature; in fact, adding water reduces the volume of air whose expansion forces the water of the boiler up in the funnel, so that in typical operating conditions the volume of coffee is proportional to the volume of air in the lower chamber. On the other hand, the volume of coffee obviously cannot be greater than the initial volume of water. The recommended "just under the safety valve" fill level thus produces near-maximum yield for any given final temperature.

Maintenance
Moka pots require periodic replacement of the rubber seal and the filters, and a check that the safety release valve is not blocked. When the rubber seal is new, it might alter the coffee taste, so a couple of "dry runs" can be made, without coffee or with used coffee grounds to "prime" it. It is an urban myth that leaving coffee stains in a moka pot is preferablethe rancid coffee should be scrubbed out of all parts of the pot. Moka pots are generally not dishwasher safe.  Running the pot through the dishwasher generally results in corrosion and oxidation of the protective oxidized layer of aluminium, leaving freshly exposed aluminium to react with the air, creating a dirty, reactive, and blackened surface. Additionally, while not producing unsafe levels, brewing with the pot after dishwasher usage results in a larger aluminium content leaching into the coffee. It is recommended to use a mild detergent.

Moka pot dimensions

The moka pot comes in various sizes based on the number of  espresso cups they produce.  The following table are the standard sizes for the Bialetti Moka Express.

Moka coffee characteristics
The flavor of moka pot coffee depends greatly on bean variety, roast level, fineness of grind, water profile, and the level of heat used.

Moka pots are sometimes referred to as stove-top espresso makers and produce coffee with an extraction ratio slightly higher than that of a conventional espresso machine.

Therefore, moka coffee is not considered to be an espresso and has different flavor characteristics.

Variations and brands 
A few companies have introduced variations to the Moka pot design. One such design has incorporated a weighted valve called Cremator or Cremavent as a pressure regulator on top of the nozzle that allows pressure to build up inside the water tank in a manner similar to a pressure cooker. As pressure builds up more quickly in this method (since there is much less leakage of vapour) compared to the standard moka pot, it reaches the level required for water to rise through the ground coffee in a shorter time. The result is coffee brewed at a higher pressure and temperature than the standard pot, making it more similar to espresso and therefore with more visible crema. 

Another variation allows for milk to be frothed and mixed with the coffee during brewing.

Some variants made of plastic instead of metal can be used in microwave ovens.

See also

 Coffee percolator
 Coffeemaker
 Neapolitan flip coffee pot
 Cafetière du Belloy

Notes

References

External links

Italian brands
Italian inventions
Coffee preparation
Bialetti
Coffee in Italy